Oberhausen is a city in the Ruhr Area, Germany

Oberhausen may also refer to:

Bavaria
Oberhausen (near Neuburg), a municipality in the Neuburg-Schrobenhausen district
Oberhausen, Weilheim-Schongau, a municipality in the Weilheim-Schongau district
Augsburg-Oberhausen, a district in Augsburg

Rhineland-Palatinate
Oberhausen an der Appel, a municipality in the Donnersbergkreis
Oberhausen an der Nahe, a municipality in the district of Bad Kreuznach
Oberhausen bei Kirn, a municipality in the district of Bad Kreuznach
Oberhausen, Südliche Weinstraße, a municipality in the district Südliche Weinstraße

Belgium
 Oberhausen is an hamlet of the town Burg-Reuland